A Restatement of the English Law of Unjust Enrichment is a legal treatise by Andrew Burrows, written in collaboration with an advisory group of academics, judges and practitioners.
The treatise  takes the form of a restatement that is akin to the American Law Institute's highly influential Restatements of the Law. Restatements are very rare in common law jurisdictions other than the United States.

Advisory Group 

 Alan Rodger, Baron Rodger of Earlsferry, former Justice of the Supreme Court of the United Kingdom
 Robert Walker, Baron Walker of Gestingthorpe, non-permanent judge of Hong Kong's Court of Final Appeal, former Justice of the Supreme Court of the United Kingdom
 Jonathan Mance, Baron Mance, Justice of the Supreme Court of the United Kingdom
 Sir Martin Moore-Bick, Lord Justice of Appeal of the Court of Appeal of England and Wales
 Sir Jack Beatson, Lord Justice of Appeal of the Court of Appeal of England and Wales
 Sir Terence Etherton, Chancellor of the High Court
 Sir Launcelot Henderson, judge of the High Court of Justice, Chancery Division
 James Edelman, justice of the High Court of Australia
 Stephen Moriarty, member of Fountain Court Chambers
 Laurence Rabinowitz, member of One Essex Court
 Stephen Elliott, member of One Essex Court
 Andrew Scott, member of Blackstone Chambers
 Robert Chambers, professor at University College London
 Gerard McMeel, professor at University of Bristol
 Charles Mitchell, professor at University College London
 Robert Stevens, professor at University College London
 William Swadling, reader at the University of Oxford
 Andrew Tettenborn, professor at the University of Swansea
 Graham Virgo, professor at the University of Cambridge

References

Legal treatises
2012 in law